EPAL (Enosis Panelliniou-Antaeus Limassol) was a Cypriot football club based in Limassol. The club was formed in 1963 after the merger of the two clubs of Limassol, Panellinios Limassol and Antaeus Limassol. EPAL was playing 7 seasons in Second Division. At 1971 the club absorbed from Aris Limassol F.C.

References

Association football clubs disestablished in 1971
Defunct football clubs in Cyprus
Association football clubs established in 1963
1963 establishments in Cyprus
1971 disestablishments in Cyprus